Nan Warshaw (born November 2, 1962) is the Co-Founder of Bloodshot Records, an independent record label based out of Chicago.

Early life and education 
Warshaw grew up in the Old Town neighborhood of Chicago as well as Evanston, Illinois.

In 1985, Warshaw graduated from Evergreen State in Olympia, Washington. In 1993, she received a master's degree in Business and Entrepreneurship from Columbia College Chicago.

Career 
Warshaw started Bloodshot Records in 1993 with co-founders Rob Miller and Eric Babcock as a hobby that they ran out of her apartment in the Wrigleyville neighborhood of Chicago. They were trying to shine a light on some of the unheralded music they were listening to and seeing in the local Chicago clubs at the time.  As of early 2019, Warshaw resigned from Bloodshot, and, as of late 2020, she and remaining co-owner Miller remained in active litigation.

In addition to her work at the label, Warshaw is involved in healthcare reform activism. In 2006, she helped to organize benefits to support Fitzgerald's sound engineer Gary Schepers cover healthcare related expenses.

She was the small business owner representative for Illinois on the White House website for health care reform under President Barack Obama. She was an active supporter of the Affordable Care Act.

Personal life 
In 2000, Warshaw married Christian "Tex" Schmidt, who was in the German band the Roughnecks. They have a son. The marriage ended in divorce. Warshaw long-term partner is Mark Panick, a musician from the bands The Bonemen of Barumba and Razorhouse.

Awards 
 2014: Chicago Tribune, Chicagoans of the Year
 2015: Columbia College Chicago, Honorary PhD
 2015: Chicago Reader, Best Local Record Label

Works and publications

See also 
 Bloodshot Records

References

Further reading 
 Warshaw, Nan R. Independent Booking of Alternative Rock. M.A. Thesis/Dissertation. Chicago, IL: Columbia College, 1993. 
 Gross, Jason, Eric Babcock, Rob Miller, Nan Warshaw, Angie Mead, Jon Langford. "Label Oral Histories: Bloodshot Records." Part One (October 9, 2006), Part Two (October 11, 2006) and Part Three (October 15, 2006). Stop Smiling. October 2006.
 Bloodshot Records Collection, 2001-2013 (ARC-0482). Rock and Roll Hall of Fame and Museum, Library and Archives. 
 Riley, Nancy Park. Underground Not Underexposed: Bloodshot Records, Alt.Country, and the Chicago Live Music Scene. Ph.D. Thesis. Athens, GA: University of Georgia, 2014.

External links 
 

1962 births
Living people